Chadwick Bay, is the name of a bay located in Dunkirk, New York on Lake Erie. It is also known as Dunkirk Harbor and also Garnsey's Bay.

The bay takes its name from Solomon Chadwick who first immigrated to the area from Weston, MA in 1810.

References

External links
 chadwickbayny.com
 USDA Chadwick Bay Region Champion Community Website

Bays of New York (state)
Bays of Lake Erie
Bodies of water of Chautauqua County, New York